Robert Joseph Champoux (born December 2, 1942) is a Canadian retired professional ice hockey goaltender. He made his National Hockey League (NHL) debut with the Detroit Red Wings on March 29, 1964 when he replaced an injured Terry Sawchuk in a 5–4 victory at Chicago Stadium that evened the semifinal series against the Blackhawks at one game apiece. After Sawchuk returned to play all the remaining matches in the Red Wings' Stanley Cup playoff run, Champoux did not play in another NHL contest until nine years later when he registered a 2–11–3 record with the California Golden Seals, the worst team in the league during the 1973–74 season. He spent the remainder of his professional hockey career in the minor leagues.

Champoux worked as a computer programmer after retiring from professional hockey.

Career statistics

Regular season and playoffs

Playoffs

References

External links
 

1942 births
Living people
California Golden Seals players
Canadian ice hockey goaltenders
Cincinnati Wings players
Detroit Red Wings players
Ice hockey people from Quebec
People from Montérégie
San Diego Gulls (WHL) players
Winston-Salem Polar Twins (SHL) players